C-type lectin domain family 4 member M is a protein that in humans is encoded by the CLEC4M gene. CLEC4M has also been designated as CD299 (cluster of differentiation 299).

This gene encodes L-SIGN (liver/lymph node-specific intracellular adhesion molecules-3 grabbing non-integrin), a type II integral membrane protein that is 77% identical to CD209 antigen, an HIV gp120-binding protein. This protein, like CD209, efficiently binds both intercellular adhesion molecule 3 (ICAM3) and HIV-1 gp120, and enhances HIV-1 infection of T cells. This gene is mapped to 19p13.3, in a cluster with the CD209 and CD23/FCER2 genes. Multiple alternatively spliced transcript variants have been found for this gene, but the biological validity of some variants has not been determined.

References

Further reading

External links
 
 
 

Clusters of differentiation